Forks of Elkhorn is an unincorporated community within Franklin County, Kentucky, United States.  It lies on US 460 where the north and south forks of Elkhorn Creek meet.  It is believed to have been established in 1784.  The town had a post office from 1848 to 1965.  The town had a station on the Frankfort and Cincinnati Railroad that was known as Elsinore for unknown reasons.

References

Unincorporated communities in Franklin County, Kentucky
Unincorporated communities in Kentucky